Oxford City Council in Oxford, England is elected every two years, with half of the 48 seats in the City Council up for election on each occasion. Elections are held in even-numbered years. Until 2002 the council was elected by thirds.

As vacancies arise between elections, by-elections are held to elect a replacement councillor.

Political control

Since the first election to the shadow authority in 1973 ahead of the reforms which came into force in 1974, political control of the council has been as follows:

Leadership
The leaders of the council since 2002 have been:

Council elections
1973 Oxford City Council election
1976 Oxford City Council election
1979 Oxford City Council election (New ward boundaries)
1980 Oxford City Council election
1982 Oxford City Council election
1983 Oxford City Council election
1984 Oxford City Council election
1986 Oxford City Council election
1987 Oxford City Council election
1988 Oxford City Council election
1990 Oxford City Council election
1991 Oxford City Council election (Some new ward boundaries & city boundary changes also took place)
1992 Oxford City Council election
1994 Oxford City Council election
1995 Oxford City Council election
1996 Oxford City Council election
1998 Oxford City Council election
1999 Oxford City Council election
2000 Oxford City Council election
2002 Oxford City Council election (New ward boundaries)
2004 Oxford City Council election
2006 Oxford City Council election
2008 Oxford City Council election
2010 Oxford City Council election
2012 Oxford City Council election
2014 Oxford City Council election
2016 Oxford City Council election
2018 Oxford City Council election
2021 Oxford City Council election (New ward boundaries)
2022 Oxford City Council election

By-election results

See also
Elections in the United Kingdom

References

External links
Oxford City Council

 
Elections
Local elections
Oxford
Oxford